The Northrop A-17, a development of the Northrop Gamma 2F model, was a two-seat, single-engine, monoplane, attack bomber built in 1935 by the Northrop Corporation for the United States Army Air Corps. When in British Commonwealth service during World War II, the A-17 was called Nomad.

Development and design
The Northrop Gamma 2F was an attack bomber derivative of the Northrop Gamma transport aircraft, developed in parallel with the Northrop Gamma 2C, (of which one was built), designated the YA-13 and XA-16. The Gamma 2F had a revised tail, cockpit canopy and wing flaps compared with the Gamma 2C, and was fitted with new semi-retractable landing gear. It was delivered to the United States Army Air Corps for tests on 6 October 1934, and after modifications which included fitting with a conventional fixed landing gear, was accepted by the Air Corps. A total of 110 aircraft were ordered as the A-17 in 1935.

The resulting A-17 was equipped with perforated flaps, and had fixed landing gear with partial fairings. It was fitted with an internal fuselage bomb bay that carried fragmentation bombs and well as external bomb racks.

Northrop developed new landing gear, this time completely retractable, producing the A-17A variant. This version was again purchased by the Army Air Corps, who placed orders for 129 aircraft. By the time these were delivered, the Northrop Corporation had been taken over by Douglas Aircraft Company, export models being known as the Douglas Model 8.

Operational history

United States
The A-17 entered service in February 1936, and proved a reliable and popular aircraft. However, in 1938, the Air Corps decided that attack aircraft should be multi-engined, rendering the A-17 surplus to requirements.

From 14 December 1941, A-17s were used for coastal patrols by the 59th Bombardment Squadron (Light) on the Pacific side of the Panama Canal.

The last remaining A-17s, used as utility aircraft, were retired from USAAF service in 1944.

Other countries

Argentina
Argentina purchased 30 Model 8A-2s in 1937 and received them between February and March 1938; their serial numbers were between 348 and 377. These remained in frontline service until replaced by the I.Ae. 24 Calquin, continuing in service as trainers and reconnaissance aircraft until their last flight in 1954.

Peru
Peru ordered ten Model 8A-3Ps, these being delivered from 1938 onwards. These aircraft were used in combat by Peru in the Ecuadorian–Peruvian War of July 1941.  The survivors of these aircraft were supplemented by 13 Model 8A-5s from Norway (see below), delivered via the United States in 1943 (designated A-33).  These remained in service until 1958.

Sweden
The Swedish government  purchased a licence for production of a Mercury-powered version, building 63 B 5Bs and 31 B 5Cs, production taking place from 1938 to 1941. They were replaced in service  with the Swedish Air Force by SAAB 17s from 1944. The Swedish version was used as a dive bomber and as such it featured prominently in the 1941 film Första divisionen.

The Netherlands
The Netherlands, in urgent need of modern combat aircraft, placed an order for 18 Model 8A-3Ns in 1939, with all being delivered by the end of the year. Used in a fighter role for which they were unsuited, the majority were destroyed by Luftwaffe attacks on 10 May 1940, the first day of the German invasion.

Iraq
Iraq purchased 15 Model 8A-4s, in 1939. They arrived in Iraq in September 1940. Twelve of them were destroyed in the Anglo-Iraqi War in 1941, and one of the three remaining aircraft crashed in early 1944.

Norway

Norway ordered 36 Model 8A-5Ns in 1940. These were not ready by the time of the German Invasion of Norway and were diverted to the Norwegian training camp in Canada, which became known as Little Norway. Norway decided to sell 18 of these aircraft as surplus to Peru, but these were embargoed by the United States, who requisitioned the aircraft, using them as trainers, designating them the A-33. Norway sold their surviving aircraft to Peru in 1943.

Great Britain
In June 1940, 93 ex-USAAC aircraft were purchased by France, and refurbished by Douglas, including being given new engines. These were not delivered before the fall of France and 61 were taken over by the British Purchasing Commission for the British Commonwealth use under the name Northrop Nomad Mk I.

South Africa
After the RAF assessed the Northrop Nomad Mk Is as "obsolete", most of the Nomads were sent to South Africa for use as trainers and target tugs. The Nomads suffered shortages of spare parts (particularly engines) and from 1942 were gradually replaced by Fairey Battles. The last Nomads were retired in 1944.

Canada
The Royal Canadian Air Force received 32 Nomads that had been part of a French order of 93 aircraft. When France fell in 1940, this order was taken over by Great Britain who transferred 32 of the aircraft to Canada where they were used as advanced trainers and target tugs as part of the British Commonwealth Air Training Plan.
These were serialed 3490 to 3521; all were assigned to No. 3 Training Command RCAF.

Variants

A-17
Initial production for USAAC.  Fixed gear, powered by  Pratt & Whitney R-1535-11 Twin Wasp Jr engine; 110 built.
A-17A
Revised version for USAAC with retractable gear and  R-1535-13 engine; 129 built.
A-17AS
Three seat staff transport version for USAAC. Powered by  Pratt & Whitney R-1340 Wasp engine; two built.
Model 8A-1
Export version for Sweden. Fixed gear. Two Douglas built prototypes (Swedish designation B 5A), followed by 63 licensed built (by ASJA) B 5B aircraft powered by  Bristol Mercury XXIV engine; 31 similar B 5C built by SAAB. 
Model 8A-2
Version for Argentina. Fitted with fixed gear, ventral gun position and powered by  Wright R-1820-G3 Cyclone; 30 built.
Model 8A-3N
Version of A-17A for Netherlands. Powered by  Pratt & Whitney R-1830 Twin Wasp S3C-G engine; 18 built.
Model 8A-3P
Version of A-17A for Peru. Powered by  GR-1820-G103 engine; ten built (c/n 412 to 421).
Model 8A-4
Version for Iraq, powered by a  GR-1820-G103 engine; 15 built.
Model 8A-5N
Version for Norway, powered by  GR-1830-G205A engine; 36 built. Later impressed into USAAF service as Douglas A-33.
Nomad Mk.I
RAF and RCAF designation for A-17A's refurbished for French use but delivered to the UK and Canada.

Operators

 Fuerza Aérea Argentina
 Grupo "A" de la Escuela de Aplicación de Aviación ("'A' Group, School of Aviation Administration"),  El Palomar Air Base
 Regimiento Aéreo Nº3 de Bombardeo Liviano ("3rd Light Bombing Air Regiment"), El Plumerillo Air Base

 Royal Canadian Air Force
 No. 3 Training Command

 Republic of China Air Force
 
 Royal Iraqi Air Force

 Luchtvaartafdeeling

 Norwegian Air Force
 Norwegian Training Unit

 Peruvian Air Force

 South African Air Force

 Swedish Air Force

 United States Army Air Corps
 General Headquarters Air Force
 3d Attack Group, Barksdale Field
 17th Attack Group, March Field
 16th Pursuit Group, Albrook Field
 74th Attack Squadron

Survivors

 A-17A, U.S. Army Ser. No. 36-0207 c/n 234, ex-3rd Attack Group (Barksdale Field), On display at the National Museum of the United States Air Force at Wright-Patterson AFB in Dayton, Ohio
 8A-3P c/n 415, registration FAP-277. This aircraft crash landed January 12, 1957 at San Sebastián de Sacraca, Ayacucho, Peru. The remains are preserved as monument at the town's main square.
 8A-3P c/n 417, registration FAP-279, ex-31o Escuadrón de Ataque y Reconocimiento. On display next to Armando Revoredo's mausoleum, Grupo Aéreo N°8, Callao, Peru, painted as "XXXI-1" to resemble the aircraft flown by Revoredo in 1940 during the "Los Zorros" raid over South America.
 RCAF Nomad 3521 crashed in Lake Muskoka, Ontario December 13, 1940. The wreck was found in July 2010 and both aircraft and the crew's remains were recovered by the RCAF.  The recovered aircraft will be put on display at the National Air Force Museum of Canada, Trenton, Ontario.

Specifications (A-17A)

See also

 Lick Observatory

References

Notes

Bibliography

Andrade, John M. . U.S Military Aircraft Designations and Serials since 1909. Leicester: Midland Counties Publications, 1979. .
 Bontti, Sergio and Jorge Núñez Padín, eds. "Northrop 8A-2 (in Spanish)".  Serie Fuerza Aérea Argentina #8,  October 2003.
 Donald, David, ed. American Warplanes of World War II. London: Aerospace, 1995. .
 Francillon, René J. McDonnell Douglas Aircraft since 1920. London: Putnam, 1979. .
 Gerdessen, F. "Round-Out". Air Enthusiast, No. 79, January/February 1999. p. 79. .
 Pelletier, Alain J. "Northrop's Connection: The Unsung A-17 Attack Aircraft and its Legacy – Part 1". Air Enthusiast, No. 75, May–June 1998, pp. 62–67. .
 Pelletier, Alain J. "Northrop's Connection: The Unsung A-17 Attack Aircraft and its Legacy – Part 2". Air Enthusiast, No. 77, September/October 1998, pp. 2–15. .
 Widfeldt, Bo and Åke Hall. B 5 Störtbombepoken (in Swedish). Nässjö, Sweden: Air Historic Research AB U.B., 2000. .

Swanborough, F. G. and Peter M. Bowers. United States Military aircraft since 1909. London: Putnam, 1963, 1971, 1989. .

External links

 Northrop A-17A – National Museum of the United States Air Force
 "Bullet Nose Fighter Flies 200 Miles An Hour" Popular Mechanics, September 1937

A-17
A-17, Northrop
Single-engined tractor aircraft
Low-wing aircraft
Aircraft first flown in 1935